This article is about the particular significance of the year 1935 to Wales and its people.

Incumbents

Archbishop of Wales – Charles Green, Bishop of Bangor
Archdruid of the National Eisteddfod of Wales – Gwili

Events
6 April – Industrialist MP Henry Haydn Jones becomes the owner of Aberllefenni Quarry.
23 April – Morriston Orpheus Choir is founded by Ivor E. Sims.
17 June – The first detection of an aircraft by ground-based radar is achieved by a team including Edward George Bowen.
October – At Nine Mile Point Colliery in Cwmfelinfach 164 miners take part in a "stay-down" strike action lasting 177 hours over the use of non-union labour.
14 November – In the UK general election:
Megan Lloyd George reverts from Independent Liberal to Liberal MP after a four-year estrangement from the party leadership.
Newly elected MPs include Arthur Jenkins at Pontypool.
3 December – Felinfoel Brewery in Llanelli becomes the first in the UK to sell beer in cans.
date unknown
Ten people are jailed at Blaina and a further 32 at Merthyr Tydfil during a period of industrial unrest in South Wales.
Penallta Colliery takes the European record for amount of coal wound in a 24-hour period.

Arts and literature
Arwel Hughes joins the BBC's music department in Cardiff.

Awards

National Eisteddfod of Wales (held in Caernarfon)
National Eisteddfod of Wales: Chair – E. Gwyndaf Evans
National Eisteddfod of Wales: Crown – Gwilym R. Jones

New books

English language
Rhys Davies – Honey and Bread
Walford Davies – The Pursuit of Music
Geraint Goodwin – Call Back Yesterday
Llewelyn Wyn Griffith – Spring of Youth
Jack Jones – Black Parade
Eiluned Lewis – December Apples (poems)
Bertrand Russell – Religion and Science
Howard Spring – Rachel Rosing

Welsh language
Thomas Parry (ed) – Baledi'r Ddeunawfed Ganrif
Ifor Williams (editor) – Canu Llywarch Hen

New drama
James Kitchener Davies – Cwm Glo
Emlyn Williams – Night Must Fall
Stephen J. Williams – Y dyn hysbys: comedi mewn tair act

Music
John Glyn Davies – Cerddi Robin Goch
Ivor Novello – Glamorous Night

Film
Y Chwarelwr, the first Welsh language film
Pink Shirts, an amateur film made by the Marquess of Anglesey and his family and written by Peter Fleming, satirizing the British Fascists movement.

Broadcasting
April – John Reith, head of the BBC, meets a deputation from the University of Wales and Welsh MPs, and agrees to Wales becoming a BBC region.
November – The BBC opens a studio in Bangor.
date unknown – The BBC Welsh Orchestra, originally founded in 1928, is re-established as a 20-piece ensemble.

Sport
Rugby 
28 September – Swansea is the first British club to defeat a touring New Zealand side and becomes the first team, club or international, to beat all three major touring Southern Hemisphere countries.

Births
13 January – Vincent Kane, broadcaster
4 February – Brian Davies, animal welfare activist (died 2022)
7 February – Cliff Jones, footballer
9 February – Paul Flynn, politician (died 2019)
27 March – Tom Parry Jones, inventor (died 2013)
29 March – Delme Bryn-Jones, operatic baritone (died 2001)
8 April – Islwyn Jones, footballer
2 May – Richard Livsey, Baron Livsey of Talgarth, politician (died 2010)
25 May – John Ffowcs Williams, engineer
27 May – Mal Evans, Beatles' roadie, born in Liverpool (shot by police 1976 in the United States)
30 May – Brayley Reynolds, footballer
24 June – Garfield Davies, trade unionist and politician (died 2019)
26 July – George Evans, footballer (died 2000)
1 August – Brian Jenkins, footballer
5 August – Kingsley Jones, rugby player (died 2003)
5 October – Colin Hudson, footballer (died 2005)
23 October – Roger Roberts, Baron Roberts of Llandudno, politician
November – Ivor Davies, painter and installation artist
30 November – Sally Roberts Jones, poet and publisher
21 December – Geoff Lewis, jockey
31 December – Edwin Regan, Roman Catholic bishop

Deaths
1 February – John Aeron Thomas, industrialist and politician, 84
15 February – Tom Reason, cricketer, 44
March – William Frost, inventor, 86
3 March – Caradog Roberts, composer, 46
13 March – Francis Vaughan, Roman Catholic bishop, 57 (post-operative complications)
20 March – Ernest Edwin Williams, journalist, author and barrister, 68
23 March – John Gwynoro Davies, minister and author, 80
24 March – Maurice Parry, footballer, 57
9 May – John Goulstone Lewis, Wales international rugby union player, 75
18 May – T. E. Lawrence, "Lawrence of Arabia", 46 (motorcycle accident)
1 July – Bill Evans, rugby player, 78
19 July – Tom Jones, cricketer, 34
12 August – Gareth Richard Vaughan Jones, journalist and secretary to Lloyd George, 29 (murdered in Manchukuo)
21 August – Matthew Vaughan-Davies, 1st Baron Ystwyth, politician, 94
20 September – Teddy Peers, footballer, 48
10 October – Samuel Evans, educationist
31 October – Noah Ablett, politician, 52 (alcohol-related)
27 November – Robert Mills-Roberts, footballer, 73
7 December – Griffith Evans, bacteriologist, 100
13 December – Amy Dillwyn, businesswoman and novelist, 90

See also
1935 in Northern Ireland

References

 
Wales
 Wales